The 2018 South Lakeland District Council election took place on 3 May 2018 to elect members of South Lakeland District Council in Cumbria, England. The whole council was up for election with boundary changes since the last election in 2016, these major changes to boundaries were recommended by the Local Government Boundary Commission for England (LGBCE)
.

Election result

This result had the following consequences for the total number of seats on the Council after the elections:

Ward results

An asterisk * indicates an incumbent seeking re-election.

Ambleside and Grasmere

Arnside and Milnthorpe

Bowness and Levens

Broughton and Coniston

Burton and Crooklands

Cartmel

Furness Peninsula

Grange

Kendal East

Kendal North

Kendal Rural

Kendal South and Natland

Kendal Town

Kendal West

Sedbergh and Kirkby Lonsdale

Ulverston East

Ulverston West

Windermere

By-Elections

A by-election was held on 20 December 2018 to fill a vacancy in Arnside & Milnthorpe following the death of Councillor Ian Stewart.

References 

South Lakeland District Council elections
2018 English local elections
2010s in Cumbria